Boruto: Naruto Next Generations is a manga series written by Ukyō Kodachi ( 1–13) and Masashi Kishimoto ( 14–) and illustrated by Mikio Ikemoto. It was launched in the 23rd issue of Shueisha's manga magazine Weekly Shōnen Jump on 9 May 2016. It ran in the magazine until the 28th issue published on 10 June 2019, and was then transferred to V Jump in the September issue released on 20 July. The original series' creator, Masashi Kishimoto, currently supervises the manga, which is  illustrated by his former chief assistant and written by the co-writer of the Boruto: Naruto the Movie screenplay. In order to keep the entire Naruto saga within a hundred volumes, Ikemoto hopes to complete the manga in fewer than 30 volumes. A spin-off manga titled  is written by Kenji Taira and has been serialised in Saikyō Jump since the March 2017 issue. Viz Media later released the first volume of the manga alongside the English dub of Boruto: Naruto the Movie.

Volume list

Chapters not yet released in tankōbon format
These chapters have yet to be published in a tankōbon volume. They were originally serialised in Japanese in issues of Shueisha's magazine V Jump and in Manga Plus by Shueisha.

References

External links
 Official Viz Media Boruto site

Boruto